The 2014 Judo Grand Prix Astana was held in Astana, Kazakhstan from 10 to 12 October 2014.

Medal summary

Men's events

Women's events

Source Results

Medal table

References

External links
 

2014 IJF World Tour
2014 Judo Grand Prix
Grand 2014
Judo
Judo